Didimus is a genus of beetles of the family Passalidae.

Distribution
These beetles can be found in tropical Africa.

Species
 Didimus aberrans (Kuwert, 1898)
 Didimus africanus (Percheron, 1844)
 Didimus aloysiisabaudiae (Pangella, 1906)
 Didimus alvaradoi Corella, 1941
 Didimus communis (Kuwert, 1898)
 Didimus crassus Arrow, 1906 (1907)
 Didimus ealaensis Hincks, 1933
 Didimus haroldi Kuwert, 1898
 Didimus knutsoni Auriv., 1886
 Didimus laevis (Klug, 1835)
 Didimus latifrons Corella, 1941
 Didimus latipunctus Zang, 1905
 Didimus nachtigali Kuwert, 1891
 Didimus parastictus  (Imohoff, 1843)
 Didimus punctipectus (Kaup, 1868)
 Didimus ruwenzoricus Arrow, 1906 (1907)
 Didimus sansibaricus Harold, 1880
 Didimus simulator Kuwert, 1891
 Didimus wissmanni (Kuwert, 1891)

References

Passalidae